Adamsons Falls is a  plunging waterfall near Hastings Caves State Reserve in Tasmania.

To access Adamsons Falls, walkers must drive past the Hastings Caves Thermal Springs, then turn right up Chestermans Road. Take the next left and the trailhead is reached. The Tasmanian Parks and Wildlife Service have recently done some clearing, so the track is fairly straightforward. Allow 2 hours return to reach the falls. The track comes out at the base of the main drop, but there are also many smaller drops further downstream.

Also in the area is Creekton Falls, less than 2 kilometres walk away from Adamsons Falls, but unfortunately the track between the two waterfalls is extremely rough and only for experienced walkers.

Waterfalls of Tasmania
Tourist attractions in Tasmania